Pierce County Airport, also known as Thun Field, is a county-owned public-use airport located  south of the central business district of Puyallup, Washington, a city in Pierce County, Washington, United States. It is located in the CDP South Hill, Washington. It is included in the Federal Aviation Administration (FAA) National Plan of Integrated Airport Systems for 2019–2023, in which it is categorized as a local general aviation facility.

Facilities and aircraft 
Pierce County Airport covers an area of 200 acres (80.9 ha) at an elevation of 537 feet (164 m) above mean sea level. It has one asphalt runway: 17/35 is 3,650 by 60 feet (1,114 x 18 m) with runway edge lights and PAPIs on both ends.

In 2016, the airport had 100,000 aircraft operations, an average of 274 per day: 96% general aviation and 3% air taxi.
In August 2019, there was 253 aircraft based at this airport: 242 single-engine and 11 multi-engine.

See also
List of airports in Washington

References

External links

Airports in Washington (state)
Transportation buildings and structures in Pierce County, Washington